Nectria is a genus of echinoderms belonging to the family Goniasteridae.

The species of this genus are found in Australia.

Species:

Nectria humilis 
Nectria macrobrachia 
Nectria multispina 
Nectria ocellata 
Nectria ocellifera 
Nectria pedicelligera 
Nectria saoria 
Nectria wilsoni

References

Goniasteridae
Asteroidea genera